Zambia competed at the 2000 Summer Paralympics in Sydney, Australia. It was the country's second participation in the Paralympic Games. Wheelchair athlete Lango Sinkamba, who had competed in the 1996 Games, took part for the second time, entering the marathon. Visually impaired sprinter Nancy Kalaba, Zambia's only other representative, made her Paralympic début, in the 100m race. Neither of them won a medal.

Athletics

Sinkamba, in the marathon, improved on his time from the 1996 Games, but by crossing the finish line in 2:51:55 he was once more last of the finishers. Kalaba finished last of her heat—her time of 15.88 was almost two seconds slower than the second-slowest overall in the heats.

See also
Zambia at the Paralympics
Zambia at the 2000 Summer Olympics

References

External links
International Paralympic Committee

Nations at the 2000 Summer Paralympics
2000
Paralympics